ANDSF most commonly refers to access network discovery and selection function, an entity within an evolved packet core of the system architecture evolution for 3GPP compliant mobile networks. It may also refer to:

 Afghan National Defense and Security Forces, the uniformed military and security forces of the Islamic Republic of Afghanistan